The 2003 AIG Japan Open Tennis Championships was a combined men's and women's tennis tournament played on outdoor hard courts at the Ariake Coliseum in Tokyo in Japan that was part of the International Series Gold of the 2003 ATP Tour and of Tier III of the 2003 WTA Tour. The tournament ran from September 29 through October 5, 2003. Rainer Schüttler and Maria Sharapova won the singles title.

Finals

Men's singles

 Rainer Schüttler defeated  Sébastien Grosjean 7–6(7–5), 6–2
 It was Schüttler's 1st title of the year and the 4th of his career.

Women's singles

 Maria Sharapova defeated  Anikó Kapros 2–6, 6–2, 7–6(7–5)
 It was the 1st title of Sharapova's career.

Men's doubles

 Justin Gimelstob /  Nicolas Kiefer defeated  Scott Humphries /  Mark Merklein 6–7(6–8), 6–3, 7–6(7–4)
 It was Gimelstob's 1st title of the year and the 10th of his career. It was Kiefer's 1st title of the year and the 3rd of his career.

Women's doubles

 Maria Sharapova /  Tamarine Tanasugarn defeated  Ansley Cargill /  Ashley Harkleroad 7–6(7–1), 6–0
 It was Sharapova's 1st title of the year and the 1st of her career. It was Tanasugarn's 2nd title of the year and the 5th of her career.

References

External links
 Official website
 ATP tournament profile

AIG Japan Open Tennis Championships
AIG Japan Open Tennis Championships
Japan Open (tennis)
AIG Japan Open Tennis Championships
AIG Japan Open Tennis Championships
AISJapan Open Tennis Championships